The East Fork River is a roughly  tributary of the New Fork River in the U.S. state of Wyoming. It flows southwest from the Wind River Range to a confluence with the New Fork south of Boulder.

Rivers of Wyoming
Rivers of Sublette County, Wyoming